Diary of a Bachelor is a 1964 American comedy film directed by Sandy Howard and starring William Traylor, Joe Silver and Dagne Crane.

Synopsis
Joanne, a young bride-to-be, has found the diary of her intended, Skip O'Hara, a man notorious for being a playboy. Sure that she'll read about his various exploits, she flips through the diary but is shocked to find that he is not exactly the type of person whom everyone believes him to be. She discovers that he has been having affairs with numerous young women and leaves Skip.

An airline hostess whose name appears often in the diary, Nancy Feather, arrives at Skip's apartment. Joanne decides to return to Skip and apologize, but when she finds Nancy with him, she leaves for good.

A year later, Skip and Nancy are married and Skip has settled down, but Nancy continues to see old boyfriends.

Cast
William Traylor as Skip O'Hara
Joe Silver as Charlie Barrett
Dagne Crane as Joanne
Denise Lor as Jane Woods
Jan Crockett as Jennifer Watters
Susan Dean as Barbara
Eleni Kiamos as Angie Pisano
Arlene Golonka as Lois
Joan Holloway as Nancy Feather
Mickey Deems as Barney Washburn
Paula Stewart as Carlotta Jones
Dom DeLuise as Marvin Rollins
Jackie Kannon as Bob Haney

Reception
Critical reception has been mixed.
TV Guide panned the film and gave it one star, stating "Told in a series of redundant flashbacks, the clumsy hand of producer/director Howard fails to keep interest for long. An unsympathetic character's life told in an uncaptivating style doesn't leave much room for praise." Variety also criticized the film as a "tame tale" with the byline "lack of names and generally pallid comedy make it candidate for second billing."

References

External links
 
 

1964 films
1964 comedy films
American International Pictures films
1960s English-language films